The 1942 Titleholders Championship was contested from March 31 to April 2 at Augusta Country Club. It was the 6th edition of the Titleholders Championship.

This event was won by Dorothy Kirby.

Final leaderboard

External links
Middlesboro Daily News source
Reading Eagle source
Herald-Journal source

Titleholders Championship
Golf in Georgia (U.S. state)
Titleholders Championship
Titleholders Championship
Titleholders Championship
Titleholders Championship
Titleholders Championship
Women's sports in Georgia (U.S. state)